Sir Alex Ferguson (born 1941) is a former Scottish football player and manager.

Alex Ferguson or Alex Fergusson may also refer to:
Alex Ferguson (baseball) (1897–1976), American baseball player
Alex Ferguson (footballer, born 1903) (1903–1974), Scottish football player
Alex Ferguson (footballer, born 1913), Scottish footballer, played for Lochee Harp, St Johnstone, Hibernian, Heart of Midlothian and Rochdale
Alex Ferguson (jockey), British jockey who rode the winning horse in the 2017 Gerry Feilden Hurdle
Alex Fergusson (musician) (born 1952), Scottish guitarist and producer
Alex Fergusson (politician) (1949–2018), Scottish politician

See also
Alexander Ferguson (disambiguation)
Alejandro Ferguson (born 1978), Argentine cricketer
Alexander Ferguson MacLaren (1854–1917), Canadian businessman and politician
Sandy Ferguson (disambiguation)